The Spanish-Portuguese War between 1735-1737 was fought over the Banda Oriental, roughly present-day Uruguay.

At that time, this part of South-America was sparsely populated and was on the border between Portuguese Colonial Brazil and the Spanish Governorate of the Río de la Plata. Spain claimed the area based on the Treaty of Tordesillas of 1494, but Portugal had founded the first city there, the Sacramento Colony, in 1680. Spain had taken the city twice, in 1681 and in 1705, but had had to give it back to the Portuguese by the Treaty of Utrecht in 1713.

The following years saw an expansion of the Portuguese settlements around the Sacramento Colony, in a radius of up to 120 km. As a reaction, capitán general of Río de la Plata Bruno Mauricio de Zabala had founded Montevideo on December 24, 1726 to prevent further expansion. But the Portuguese trade made the Spanish suffer, as they were still compelled to trade with Spain over the Viceroyalty of Peru, who imposed heavy taxes. Spain considered the Portuguese presence illegitimate and their trade contraband.

In March 1734, the new capitán general of Río de la Plata, Miguel de Salcedo y Sierraalta, received orders from Madrid to reduce the action radius of the Sacramento Colony to "a gunshot", say two kilometers. He sent an ultimatum to António Pedro de Vasconcelos, the Portuguese governor of the colony, who stalled for time.

In 1735 tensions raised between Spain and Portugal and Spanish ships under Alzaybar captured several Portuguese vessels. On April 19, Prime minister José Patiño ordered Salcedo to attack Sacramento.

Salcedo gathered 1500 men and marched slowly on Sacramento, wasting much time attacking minor targets along the road. He was supported by 4,000 Guaraní warriors who came from the Jesuit Reductions. The siege started on October 14, 1735.

By that time Vasconcelos had prepared the defense with a garrison of about 900 men, and sent a messenger to Rio de Janeiro to ask for reinforcements. José da Silva Pais sent six Portuguese ships, which arrived on January 6 followed by 12 more ships a few days later. The Spanish had tried to impose a naval blockade, but the Portuguese had more ships and gained naval superiority.

In 1736 and 1737 more ships were sent from Spain and Portugal and an occasional confrontation between a few ships occurred. But Spain couldn't gain the upper hand and on September 6, 1736, the Portuguese even lay siege to Montevideo, but withdrew when Salcedo sent a relief force of 200 men.

On March 16, 1737 under influence of France, Great Britain and the Dutch Republic, a treaty was signed. In September the siege was lifted and the Spanish withdrew their forces and Miguel de Salcedo was disposed as governor of Buenos Aires.

The war was local and involved only a couple of thousand men on each side.

Ships involved

Portugal

Spain

Notes

References
Robert Southey, History of Brazil (1819)

External links
Guerras entre España y Portugal en la cuenca del Río de la Plata (Spanish)

18th century in Spain
1730s in Spain
1730s in Portugal
1735 in Spain
1735 in Portugal
1737 in Spain
1737 in Portugal
Military history of Uruguay
Wars involving Spain
Wars involving Portugal
18th century in Portugal
18th century in Uruguay
1730s conflicts
Portugal–Spain military relations
Portuguese colonization of the Americas
1730s in South America
1735 in South America
1736 in South America
1737 in South America